The Ouricuri River is a river of Pernambuco state in Northeast Brazil.

See also
List of rivers of Pernambuco

References
Brazilian Ministry of Transport

Rivers of Pernambuco